Curtice is a census-designated place in northern Allen Township, Ottawa County, and southwestern Jerusalem Township, Lucas County, Ohio, United States. As of the 2010 census it had a population of 1,526. It has a post office, with the ZIP code of 43412.

Demographics

Notable people

Jordan Kovacs, former captain of the University of Michigan football team, now safety for the Miami Dolphins
Chris Bassitt, pitcher for the New York Mets baseball team
Michael Deiter, offensive lineman for the Miami Dolphins

References

Census-designated places in Lucas County, Ohio
Census-designated places in Ottawa County, Ohio
Census-designated places in Ohio